Acrolophus arimusalis is a moth of the family Acrolophidae. It is found in Brazil (Para).

References

Moths described in 1858
arimusalis